Sayyed Abul Hasan Rafiee Qazvini was an Iranian philosopher and jurist.

Early life
Sayyed Abul Hasan Rafiee Qazvini was born in 1890 in Qazvin Province, Iran. His family were the relatives of Molla Khalil Qazvini. His father Abul Hasan Ibn Khalil Al Hosseini was also a jurist. The family name Rafiee was given to him from his grandfather, Ayatollah Mirza Rafie.

As a child, Qazvini learned literature and Arabic. He studied at the school of Salehiyyah of Qazvin. Later, he taught at the school of Sadr. He was the imam of the Sultani Mosque for some years.

Teachers
Qazvini studied under many grand teachers, including Hajj Molla Ali Taromi. Ayatllah Molla Ali Akbar Takestani, Sheykh Abdun Nabi Nouri, Mirza Masih Taleqani, Ayatollah Sayyed Muhammed Tonekaboni, Ayatollah Sheikh Muhammad Reza Nouri, Mirza Hasan Kermanshahi, Hajj Fazel Tehrani Shemirani, Mirza Mahmoud Qommi, Aqa Mirza Ebrahim Zanjani, Aqa Sheikh Ali Rashti, and Sheykh Abul Karim Haeri Yazdi.

Career
During his career, Qazvini studied exact sciences and philosophy. He strove for simplicity and taught subjects such as the Asfar simply. He was concerned with philosophical and theological subjects for 60 years. Both the Grand Ayatollah Sayyed Abul Hasan Esfahani and Sheykh Muhammad reza Masjed Shahi Esfahani gave Qazvini permission regarding the Ijtihad and narrations.

Pupils
Qazvini's pupils included Ayatollah Sayyed Razi Shirazi, Sheykh Muhyy Addin Anvari, Shahcherghi, Hajj Mostafa Masjed Jameei, Sheykh Muhammad Ali Zahabi Shirazi Hakim, and Ayatollah Hasan Zadeh Amoli.

Works
Qazvini wrote close to 20 books on diverse subjects. Some of them include Explanation of Duaye Sahar, The Treatise of Meraj, Treatise on Rajat, An Article of Asfar Arbah, An Article About the Substantive Motion, Treatise on Monism, and An Article on Copula.

Family
Qazvini had 14 children: four daughters and ten sons.

Death
Qazvini died in 1975 at the age of 85. He is buried in the Fatima Masumeh Shrine in Qom.

References

External links
 Qazvini at the Encyclopedia of Islam
 Obituary of Qazvini in Bukhara Magazine

1890 births
1975 deaths
20th-century Muslim scholars of Islam